Sir John Hamely or Hamylyn (born after 1324 – died 1399), of Wimborne St. Giles, Dorset, was an English Member of Parliament.

He was a Member (MP) of the Parliament of England for Liskeard in 1355, for Lostwithiel in 1355, 1358, for Truro in 1355,  1358 for Cornwall in 1357, 1360 and 1362, for Launceston in 1358, for Helston in 1358 and 1361, for Bodmin in 1361, for Dorset in 1371, 1376, January 1377 and 1391.

References

14th-century births
1399 deaths
14th-century English people
Politicians from Dorset
Members of the Parliament of England (pre-1707)